Letterkenny Retail Park and Riverside Retail Park are retail parks on the Paddy Harte/Link Road in central Letterkenny, County Donegal.

History

Phases
Phase 1 opened with Atlantic Homecare, Toymaster, Lidl, Harry Corry and other stores.

Phase 2 construction finished by 2005, with stores such as Next, New Look, Tempest, TK Maxx, Argos and SuperValu. Marks and Spencer and Menarys Department Store opened in May 2007. Due to the post 2008 downturn SuperValu closed on 6 January 2009. Phase 2 of the retail park was developed by Patrick J.  Doherty.

Riverside Retail Park
Construction of the Riverside Retail Park commenced in 2006. It has a total of 10 retail units. The first store opened in this phase was a ladies fashion clothing store, followed by Donegal Sports and Sony Centre.

Receivership and sale
In March 2012, Bank of Ireland appointed KPMG as receiver to Letterkenny Retail Park. 

As of 2022, Letterkenny Retail Park had been placed on sale for around €35 million. At the time it had 36 retail warehouse units. The standalone McDonald's drive-thru fast food restaurant and Lidl supermarket were not included in the sale. The Dunnes Stores was also not included in the sale.

See also
 Courtyard Shopping Centre

References

Buildings and structures in Letterkenny
Retail parks in the Republic of Ireland